Kondazi (also Romanized as Kondāzī; also known as Kondārī and Kundāzi) is a village in Abarj Rural District, Dorudzan District, Marvdasht County, Fars Province, Iran. At the 2006 census, its population was 557, in 152 families.

References 

Populated places in Marvdasht County